Jerome Paul "Boomer" Groom (August 15, 1929 – February 29, 2008) was an American football player. Born in Des Moines, Iowa, he graduated from Dowling Catholic High School in Des Moines. He played college football for the Notre Dame Fighting Irish football team and was a consensus selection at the center position on the 1950 College Football All-America Team.  He then played professional football in the National Football League (NFL) for the Chicago Cardinals from 1951 to 1955.  He was chosen to play in the 1954 Pro Bowl.

Groom later served as a color commentator for the Denver Broncos' radio broadcasts in their inaugural American Football League (AFL) season in 1960. In 1994, he was inducted into the College Football Hall of Fame. He died in 2008 at age 78 in Sarasota, Florida.

See also
 List of people with surname Groom

References

External links

1929 births
2008 deaths
All-American college football players
American football centers
American Football League announcers
American football linebackers
Chicago Cardinals players
College Football Hall of Fame inductees
Denver Broncos announcers
Eastern Conference Pro Bowl players
Notre Dame Fighting Irish football players
Players of American football from Des Moines, Iowa